In 2015, Condé Nast Traveler described Beijing's LGBT scene as "under-the-radar yet energized".

The city hosts the Beijing Queer Film Festival. Gay bars include Adam's, Destination, Funky, Kai Bar, Red Dog, and The Rabbit; the cocktail bar Más is considered LGBT-friendly. Chill Bar has a monthly lesbian party, and the Beijing Lesbian Center started a lesbian salon in 2004.

See also
 Beijing LGBT Center
 Homosexuality in China
 Transgender in China

References